Beating Again is a 2015 South Korean television series starring Jung Kyung-ho, Kim So-yeon, and Yoon Hyun-min. It aired on jTBC from April 3 to May 23, 2015 on Fridays and Saturdays at 21:45 (KST) time slot for 16 episodes.

Synopsis
Kang Min-ho (Jung Kyung-ho) is a cold-blooded corporate raider who takes no prisoners. He is a scoundrel investment banker for Gold Investment, seemingly the world's largest financial service firm. As a cynical, self-defensive, suspicious sociopath, he wears down people with his tenacity and takes advantage of them with his delusions of grandeur. However, Min-ho has his own story of how he became evil - it was because of his uncle's betrayal. His father was overthrown by his uncle and it caused his family to hit bottom. As Min-ho vows to get revenge, he meets Soon-jung (Kim So-yeon), the daughter of his father's former secretary who betrayed him and who now works for his uncle. One day, he has a heart attack and is taken to a hospital. He miraculously survives his heart attack after undergoing a heart transplant. His heart is actually from Dong-wook (Jin Goo), a young detective and Soon-jung's fiancé, who suffered from brain damage from a mysterious car accident. After receiving a new life thanks to the new heart, he is no longer the cold and callous person that he has been and undergoes a profound change to his personality, talking differently and warming up people. But he still pursues his plan to get revenge on his uncle even though his emotions get in the way at times. He gradually learns the meaning of happiness when he finds Soon-jung, whom he wants to cherish and protect. His heart becomes tender and his eyes swell with tears when as he works with her. He falls in love with her without realizing it.

Cast
 Jung Kyung-ho as Kang Min-ho
 Lee Tae-woo as young Min-ho
 Kim So-yeon as Kim Soon-jung
 Jung Da-bin as young Soon-jung
 Yoon Hyun-min as Lee Joon-hee
 Jin Goo as Ma Dong-wook 
 Gong Hyun-joo as Han Ji-hyun
 Lee Si-eon as Oh Woo-sik
 Park Yeong-gyu as Kang Hyun-chul
 Ahn Suk-hwan as Ma Tae-seok
 Nam Myung-ryul as Lee Jung-gu
 Jo Eun-ji as Na Ok-hyun
 --- as Min Hye-ri
 --- as Kang Sung-min
 --- as Kang Ji-min
 Kim Jung-seok as Director Yoon
 Lee Soo-ji as Oh Mi-ru
 Jung Yoo-min as Yoo Yoo-mi
 Im Sung-eun
 Kim Hee-jung as Kang Min-ho's mother
 Jang Tae-sung
 Ricky Kim as Wigo (cameo, ep. 4)

International broadcast
 Philippines: GMA Network aired the series under the title Carmina replacing Dangwa from February 1 to March 23, 2016. Re-aired on GMA News TV in 2019

References

External links
  
 
 

2015 South Korean television series debuts
2015 South Korean television series endings
JTBC television dramas
South Korean romantic comedy television series
Television series by Kim Jong-hak Production
Television series by Doremi Entertainment